Air Conflicts: Aces of World War II is a 2009 arcade-style combat flight simulation video game developed by Finnish Studio Cowboy Rodeo and published by Graffiti Entertainment. Set during World War II, the game was developed for the PlayStation® Portable and released in 2009. It is the sequel to the 2006 game Air Conflicts.

Gameplay
The game features 13 campaigns with 240 missions in which the player can pick up the task of flying for the US Army Air Force, Royal Air Force, Luftwaffe, or the Red Army Air Force. The game features a multiplayer mode in which up to 8 players can participate through ad-hoc.

Reception 
The game received a poor 2/10 review from IGN, being summarized as "painful" and criticized for poor framerate during heavy fighting outside the Pacific Campaign. IGN also noted its clunky controls, imperfect hitboxes leading to munitions ignoring enemy targets, extremely long load times, poor menu design and extensive use of the PSP's battery.

Reviews from GameSpot are less critical of the game, mostly having problems with the difficulty of some gameplay parts and design choices. They praised the games dogfights and the amount of content and its variety. Overall GameSpot gives the game a moderate 6/10. 

Reviews by Metacritic are relatively poor, at only 36%, with reviews citing poor load times, graphics, presentation, and lack of readable fonts, going so far as to describe the game as "unplayable." 

It placed third on GameRant's list of Top 10 Worst Sony PSP Games.

References

2009 video games
Flight simulation video games
North America-exclusive video games
PlayStation Portable games
PlayStation Portable-only games
Video games developed in Finland
Multiplayer and single-player video games